Starfire (Princess Koriand'r) is a superheroine appearing in American comic books published by DC Comics. She debuted in a preview story inserted within DC Comics Presents #26 (October 1980) and was created by Marv Wolfman and the late George Pérez. The name "Starfire" first appeared (for an unrelated character) in a DC Comic in the story "The Answer Man of Space," in Mystery in Space #73, February 1962, written by Gardner Fox.

In 2013, Starfire placed 21st on IGN's "Top 25 Heroes of DC Comics."

Starfire has appeared in numerous cartoon television shows and films, including as a member of the Teen Titans in Cartoon Network's eponymous series, voiced by Hynden Walch. Koriand'r made her live adaptation debut in the DC Universe and HBO Max series Titans, played by Anna Diop.

Publication history
The design of the character (Koriand'r) incorporated aspects of many existing characters. Artist George Pérez, in explaining the creation of the character, stated:

Fictional character biography

Starfire is actually Princess Koriand'r of the planet Tamaran in the Vega system, and was in line to rule the planet as queen. Komand'r (also known as Blackfire), her older sister, developed a bitter rivalry with her after suffering a disease in infancy that robbed her of the ability to harness solar energy to allow her to fly, and by extension, her right to the throne. This rivalry continued and intensified when the siblings were sent for warrior training with the Warlords of Okaara. Things came to a head during a sparring exercise in which Komand'r attempted to kill her sister. As a result, Komand'r was expelled and she swore vengeance.

That revenge came in a plot where Komand'r betrayed her planet by supplying detailed information about Tamaran's defenses to their enemies, the Citadel. They conquered Tamaran with ease, and the surrender conditions included the enslavement of Koriand'r, who was never permitted to return, since that would mean the Citadel would devastate the planet for breaking the treaty. To her horror, Koriand'r learned that Komand'r was her master; her own older sister made the most of her sibling's years of horrific servitude, which included frequent torture and sexual exploitation. When Koriand'r killed one of her captors, Komand'r decided to execute her as punishment, but the sisters were attacked and captured by the Psions, a group of sadistic alien scientists. While performing deadly experiments on the sisters to test their solar energy absorption limits, the Psion were attacked by Komand'r's forces. Koriand'r broke free using her newly developed starbolts, destructive blasts of ultraviolet energy which were a result of the experiment. Out of misguided familial loyalty, she freed Komand'r, who was still absorbing more amounts of ultraviolet energy. Far from grateful, Komand'r contemptuously struck her sister down with the same, but with more intensity and power and had her restrained for later execution.

Koriand'r escaped by stealing a spacecraft to flee to the nearest planet, Earth, where she met the first Robin (Dick Grayson) and his compatriots; she joined them in forming the Teen Titans. She became a charter member of this team and remained a member for years, finding work as a professional model using the name Kory Anders.

Infinite Crisis

During Infinite Crisis, Starfire joined Donna's New Cronus Team that went to investigate a hole in the universe that was found during the Rann-Thanagar War. They arrived at the reset center of the universe and with the help of assorted heroes aided in the defeat of Alexander Luthor, who was attempting to recreate the multiverse and build a perfect Earth from it. She is reported missing at the end of the crisis.

52

On the seventh day of the fifth week of 52, Starfire is shown to be stranded on a paradise-like planet with Animal Man and Adam Strange. In the same issue, it was revealed that energy ripples caused by Alexander Luthor, Jr., altered the Zeta Ray Beams the space heroes were going to use to return home; among other things, it caused the trio to be teleported together to the planet.

A week and some time later, Starfire is seen eating an odd narcotic native fruit. Luckily, Adam's tough love seems to snap her out of it, or at least make her stop eating the fruit. Two days later, Devilance, a being whose presence Buddy had sensed earlier, appears to Starfire. A week, two days, and two nights later, Adam and Buddy go looking for her. Unfortunately, they find her caught in a large net, hanging from above. Just as Buddy realizes it is a trap, he and Adam get caught in a similar net, with Devilance staring at them. Three days and two nights later, Starfire awakens and works together with her comrades to distract Devilance. She pays Devilance back for capturing her by stealing his staff and striking him with it before catching up with Buddy and Adam. As the trio head back to the ship, hoping to use the staff as a power source, Devilance broods, bound by the same vines he had used to restrain his captives.

At the end of week 16, the repairs on the ship are completed and the trio take off for Earth. Devilance later suddenly attacks the ship and takes back his lance. Just as Devilance is about to destroy the ship, he is torn apart by Lobo. Believing he is going to attack them next, Starfire convinces Lobo to help the trio by offering payment, but not before he rips her top off. She returns to the ship to explain the situation to her companions while Lobo hitches the ship to his space bike. They follow Lobo in his new stronghold in Sector 3500, a sector of space mysteriously ravaged, and ruled by Lobo acting as religious man. To save him, and the inhabitants, from a swarm of strange creatures, Starfire is forced to use the Emerald Eye of Ekron, alerting Ekron himself. The ragtag team is then forced to flee, with Lobo acting as their guide, gaining Ekron's help and discovering their real enemy, Lady Styx, bringing havoc and mayhem in the entire Galaxy. Starfire agrees to fight her, and she is brought as a prisoner of the galactic villainess by Lobo, in an attempt to foil her defences. The attempt succeeds, but Buddy is seemingly killed, and Lobo leaves.

Starfire and Adam are left alone in space, their ship slowly breaking apart, still pursued by angry Lady Styx followers. Starfire is badly injured, and a blind Adam Strange, who is reliant on machinery which is no longer useful, cannot do anything to help her. Just as they are going to crash into a sun, however, Mogo and a rookie Green Lantern come to their rescue. Cured, but still recovering, she travels to Earth to return Buddy's jacket back to his wife Ellen, unaware that Buddy was resurrected and arrived on Earth shortly before her. Upon her return, she manages to destroy two of Lady Styx's followers who were attacking Buddy and his wife. She then returns Buddy's jacket to his wife, before passing out from exhaustion and is left in the care of the Baker Family.

Countdown to Adventure

Starfire, Adam Strange, and Animal Man are fated to join forces again in the coming Countdown to Adventure 8-issue miniseries. In Issue #1 of the series, Starfire discovers her powers have gone but decides to make an attempt at a normal life. Buddy invites her to stay with the family as an after-school sitter despite Ellen's discomfort with how close Buddy and Starfire seem. This worsens when Buddy's son attacks Kory whilst under the effects of Lady Styx's virus. Animal Man's decision to follow Starfire rather than watch over his son in the hospital leads Ellen to ask if he's in love with her, to which Buddy does not reply. Despite the loss of her powers, Starfire demonstrates her combat abilities as she and Animal Man fight off crowds of people infected by the virus.

They are later trapped in San Diego with the infectees where they are joined by the Teen Titans who are trying to break through a force field to get to the Healers ship. After Buddy is captured, Ellen joins Starfire to save Animal Man from dissection but are interrupted by more victims of the Lady Styx virus. Alanna and Adam Strange arrive at the scene via the Zeta Beam and meet up with Starfire and Ellen Baker, saves Buddy, and teleports to Rann restoring Starfire's powers and she then rids the planet of Lady Styx's virus.

The team finds out that the sterilization is taking place in San Diego. Starfire uses her powers to heal the people, and is later seen leaving the Baker household for parts unknown. Starfire, Animal Man, Ellen, and Adam Strange are teleported by a broken Zeta Beam to Earth. Starfire attempts to rid the disease but is soon tackled by Champ Hazard into the ground. Adam Strange blasts Champ off Kory and she cures San Diego of the Lady Styx virus. She then leaves the Baker's household to return to the Titans.

Rann-Thanagar Holy War

The trio again join forces in the Rann-Thanagar Holy war. After a meeting at Titans Tower, Adam Strange Zeta Beams Starfire and Animal Man to Rann. Apparently the belief of Lady Styx still remained even after the virus has been eliminated. Their plan is to use a telepath to show the horror of Lady Styx.

Titans Together
After the apparent defeat of Lady Styx, Starfire once again returned to Animal Man's home. One afternoon, she and Animal Man's son were attacked by a water demon in Buddy's swimming pool. Meanwhile, her old Titan teammates had also been attacked by assorted demonic entities. This led to Starfire, Nightwing, Troia, Cyborg, Beast Boy, Raven, Kid Flash, and Red Arrow, to reassemble as a team, when they realized that the attacks are the result of a resurrected Trigon and his newly discovered three sons. While investigating, the Titans began to experience unexplained mood-shifts.

Soon after, the team met up in New York's Central Park, where they attempted to recover from these mood-shifts and realize that each shift coincided with one of the seven deadly sins. The team was then approached by the Sons of Trigon. They battled the villainous progeny, and drove them away. Starfire and Nightwing then discuss their actions while under the influence of Trigon's sons. While Nightwing shows hints at wanting to renew their relationship, Starfire questions his commitment to the relationship and goes so far as to ask Nightwing whether or not he's ready for them to be together without ever having to find excuses. Nightwing to his own surprise and reluctance admits that while he does love her and always will, he is not, leading to them for now leaving their reunion in doubt.

Most recently, she has been captured and turned into a Justifier, as seen in Final Crisis: Resist. She has since been freed, although the loss of control she gathered from the Justifier helmet distressed her severely. She was more than happy to destroy a warehouse full of them when Mister Terrific offered her and Cyborg to destroy them.

Blackest Night
During Hero's Day, a time when the heroes of the DC Universe join in remembrance of dead comrades, Starfire and the Titans were attacked by Black Lantern versions of their fallen teammates. During the battle, Starfire and Cyborg were subjected to a psychic attack by the Black Lantern Omen, putting them both in a euphoric state as they experienced their greatest desires (for Starfire, marrying Dick Grayson). Both she and Cyborg were rescued by Beast Boy.

Justice League and R.E.B.E.L.S.
Following the dissolution of the current JLA after Blackest Night, Starfire is invited by Donna to join Kimiyo Hoshi's new Justice League. After a short time with the team, Starfire quit the team and left a note to Dick explaining why. She then returns to where Tamaran used to be, to find that it had mysteriously returned. It is revealed that Vril Dox of Legion has moved the planet Rann where Tamaran used to be. Starfire agrees to join Legion and enters into a relationship with Captain Comet. Soon Tamaranean refugees, led by Blackfire, attack Rann believing that since the planet was in Tamaran's orbit they had claim to it. The violence was ended when Vril Dox, who was off-world at the start of the conflict, arrived with Thanagarian warships and stopped the fighting without bloodshed on either side. The tension between the Rannians and the Tamaraneans was resolved by allowing the Tamaraneans to live on Rann's uninhabited southern continent. Although her relationship with Comet was only physical for her, Comet thought different thus ending their relationship. She also assisted the Green Lantern Corp in battling Psions. Starfire helped create an alliance between Rannians, Tamaraneans and L.E.G.I.O.N. after defeating Starro the Conqueror, ensuring security for Rann, the Vega System and the galaxy. She later returns to Earth and is among the many heroes present at Ryan Choi's funeral.

Red Hood and the Outlaws

In 2011, DC Comics cancelled all of their monthly titles and rebooted the DC Universe continuity with 52 new titles in an initiative dubbed The New 52. As part of the relaunch, Starfire became the cast member of the series Red Hood and the Outlaws. In the new continuity, the character appears to have a similar origin, though she is now a member of that titular group, in which Jason Todd (Red Hood) and Roy Harper (Arsenal) are her teammates. As in the previous continuity, she has a past relationship with Dick Grayson. One significant change to her backstory is that she was sold into slavery by her sister to save Tamaran from the Citadel. Another is that her ship, which crashed on a tropical island, appears to be her primary home, where she keeps a number of articles of Dick Grayson's clothing - which eventually serve to become part of Jason's "Red Hood" uniform.

Aliens of all sorts, but especially Tamaraneans, are hunted after on Earth as a man called Crux finds a picture of her, then attacks her and attempts to drain her powers away. After she is attacked by Crux, it is revealed she was experimented on to some measure by The Citadel, which allowed her to retain her power through unconventional means after being hit with technology designed to drain her powers.

Starfire, at first, seemingly no longer remembers the Teen Titans when asked about them. However, it's later shown that she does retain her memories and recalls Dick Grayson and Roy's full name. Her sexual desires are brought up very casually when she offhandedly offers Harper a chance to sleep with her. Kory tells Jason and Roy that Tamaraneans are said to have a short attention span when it comes to "all things Earth," seeing humans as little more than sensory experiences. Later, it is shown that Koriand'r lied about her species' characteristics for personal reasons, and that her race in fact processes romantic feelings very deeply.

In a flashback, Jason reveals that Koriand'r is the one who found him and nursed him back to health on the island she has made her home (after her ship crashed on it). The two attempted a romantic relationship, but Jason later notes that "[they] just friend-zoned each other;" however, he considers her a dear friend, and narrates that if he ever gets used to Koriand'r kissing him, to shoot him.

It's soon revealed that Koriand'r is commander of a spaceship named Starfire, the crew consisting of slaves she helped free when she herself escaped slavery. The Starfire has returned to earth for Kory because that Tamaran has been taken over by The Blight, a parasitic alien race. Starfire talks to Roy and Jason in private and explains that she and Komand'r, her sister, were always not on the best of terms, though they tried. This is mainly because Kory blames her sister and the people of Tamaran for her enslavement, so she is torn on if she should help them now. Roy is then kidnapped during an attack on the ship and taken to Tamaran, driving Star to go to her home planet. Eventually, Starfire decides she cannot leave her people and her sister helpless, so after they rescue Roy, the Outlaws and the crew of the Starfire help Blackfire take back Tamaran, and Kori reconciles with her sister.

Later on, Kory's memories are forcefully returned, which leads Roy Harper to discover that she lied about her nonchalance towards relationships. Roy breaks up with her because of his own trust issues (particularly towards Oliver Queen), but the two reconcile later on, resulting in a much more tender relationship, since Kory is able to be emotive as she normally is, and no longer has to hide her emotions. Roy openly admits to Jason several times that he loves her, and later on, the pair confess their love to one another.

Right at the end of the series, Tamaran is invaded again by Helspont, and, to ensure the safety of her people, Blackfire sides with him on the condition that Tamaran be spared. Koriand'r is devastated, but eventually, however, Blackfire hears her sister's pleas and betrays Helspont, destroying him and nearly killing herself in the process.

This leads Kory and Roy to break up - though purely out of necessity - as Koriand'r is forced to return to Tamaran, so that Blackfire can get the medical attention she needs. The two share a kiss, and Koriand'r promises to remember Roy for "forever and a day." After Starfire departs, Roy announces to Jason that he, too, will now go his separate way, too, thus leaving Jason on his own. Rose Wilson, who was hired to kill Koriand'r (but eventually decided not to when she realised she was hired by Helspont), asks if Jason needs a minute after losing his team. He replies that they were not a team, they were friends.

Starfire
In 2015, Koriand'r was given a new solo ongoing series titled Starfire, wherein she returns to Earth (presumably by this point her sister is healed) - specifically, to Key West, a city (and island) in Florida. She befriends the local Sheriff, Stella Gomez, and a super-powered woman whose civilization lives inside the Earth's surface, called Atlee. As of issue #5, she has also befriended Stella's widowed brother, Sol (who bears a striking resemblance to Dick Grayson), and appears to not be particularly interested in heroism.

DC Rebirth
In DC's new status quo, DC Rebirth, Starfire is in the Teen Titans book, recruited by Damian Wayne to be a part of his new Teen Titans. After Damian crosses a line by kicking Wally West off the team, Starfire is chosen as the new leader of the Teen Titans. Starfire eventually joins the Justice League Odyssey consisting of herself, Cyborg, Green Lantern (Jessica Cruz), Azrael & Darkseid.

She is later converted against her will to join Darkseid before being seemingly killed by her sister Blackfire, who believes that she will be brought back to life by Epoch.

s and other relationships

While a member of the Teen Titans, Koriand'r was frequently romantically involved with Robin (Dick Grayson). She has been married twice, both times to Tamaranean men: once to the Prince Karras to seal a peace treaty; and once to General Phy'zzon out of love. Karras died in battle, while Phy'zzon died trying to defend New Tamaran against the Sun Eater.

In between these, she nearly married Dick Grayson, but their wedding was interrupted by Raven (who was evil at the time). Raven murdered the priest before he could pronounce Dick and Koriand'r husband and wife but canonically they were still married regardless (The Flash (vol. 2) #81-83). The relationship was already on unsteady ground after Raven came in, with Koriand'r fearing that Dick was rushing into marriage and also concerned about the anti-alien sentiments that sprang up in response to the news of the impending nuptials.

In the Titans of Tomorrow storyline, Batwoman said that Starfire would have a wonderful future with Nightwing. The half-blood Mar'i Grayson was born from their union in the Kingdom Come timeline. However, during Infinite Crisis, an image from the Titans Tomorrow timeline shows a gravestone implied to belong to a deceased Dick Grayson.

In recent years, the character was developed to be polyamorous and pansexual. Deriving from being raised on the culture of her homeworld Tamaran, where it's acceptable to have open marriage, Starfire's sex-positivism and free-thinking habits such as a fondness for practicing nudism, openness to polygamous relationships and acceptance of "open sex" and pansexual "free-love" with persons regardless of terrestrial species, race or gender, usually lead her into conflict with Earth's more reserved culture and customs. For Starfire, polyamory was a personal and cultural preference.
|

Powers and abilities
Starfire is a Tamaranean and as such her physiology is designed to constantly absorb ultraviolet radiation. The radiation is then converted to pure energy, allowing her to fly at supersonic speeds. Starfire is capable of using this power to fly in space and even go fast enough to cross several solar systems in minutes to seconds. This energy also gives her incredible superhuman strength and durability. This strength, combined with her fighting skills, allowed her to defeat the powerful Donna Troy about one out of three times during purely hand to hand matches. She later proved strong enough to fight against Wonder Woman for a certain period of time and, during a fit of rage, was so strong that Donna Troy was unable to contain her without the help of Mon-El. In the 2003 TV series, she was strong enough to easily throw vehicles and destroy entire streets with her blows. After being experimented on by the alien Psions, Starfire gained the ability to release her absorbed energy into incredibly powerful blasts called "starbolts."

As shown in the "Insiders" crossover story arc (Teen Titans and Outsiders), Starfire can also release nearly all of her stored energy as a powerful Omni-directional explosive burst, many times stronger and more powerful than her standard blasts. The released energy leaves her in a weakened state. She's also shown that she can consciously absorb ambient Ultraviolet  Energy  Starfire also demonstrated more control over her powers in the New 52 reboot, having used her internal energy to melt the metal of Jason Todd's gun when it came into contact with her skin. Starfire, and all Tamaraneans, are capable of assimilating languages through physical contact with another person. When Starfire attempts to do so with a male, she typically does so by kissing because it is "more fun" for her. Starfire is also proficient in hand-to-hand combat, having been trained by the Warlords of Okaara. She also doesn't need to eat, drink, sleep and doesn't require an atmosphere to breathe unless she is low on ultraviolet energy.

Other versions
 In Amalgam Comics, Starfire (Kory) was combined with Shatterstar from Marvel Comics to create Shatterstarfire.
 In the alternate timeline of the Flashpoint event, Starfire joins with the Amazons' Furies. She intends to burn the city to the ground. Starfire then goes after circus members Dick Grayson and Boston Brand for Doctor Fate's Helm of Nabu. Starfire and the Amazons with her are killed in a gasoline explosion caused by Dick.
 In Kingdom Come universe, Kory married Dick and they had a daughter named Mar'i Grayson. At some point she dies, putting a strain on Dick and Mar'i's relationship. Mar'i was inspired by her parents to become the superheroine Nightstar.
 In the Superman/Batman Mash-Up universe, Star Canary is an amalgamation of Starfire and Black Canary.
 In the comic tie-in to Injustice: Gods Among Us, Starfire and the Titans are devastated when the nuclear explosion caused by the Joker kills Beast Boy and Kid Flash. She still harbors a romantic interest for Dick Grayson (who recently left the team to join the Justice League) in this reality. Despite Dick's warnings, she and the other Titans arrive at the Fortress of Solitude to help Superboy stop Superman. Superman mortally wounds Superboy and sends the rest of the Titans into the Phantom Zone to not only save Conner's life, but to also make sure they don't interfere with his plans. In the prequel to Injustice 2, she and the rest of the Titans are rescued from the Phantom Zone by the Insurgency.
 In Teen Titans Go! #46 (a comic book spin-off from the TV series), it is revealed that Starfire has a younger brother named Wildfire. When the Gordanians had attacked Tamaran, her parents set up a ship to save him by launching him to another planet, thus saving the Tamaranean royal family bloodline. Afterwards, Blackfire, in an attempt to make a treaty between the Tamaranians and Gordanians, gives them Starfire as a slave (setting up her appearance in the episode "Go!"). As a result of Starfire and Wildfire's absence, their parents had tragically died of a broken heart. Wildfire seemingly comes to Earth to meet up with his second eldest sister, but he is revealed to be the shapeshifting Madame Rouge, who was aided in the deception by Blackfire. Discovering this, a furious and heartbroken Starfire disowns Blackfire and vows to find her long-lost younger brother, as he is the only family she has left.
 In Teen Titans: Earth One, Starfire appears as the source of power for Cyborg, Changeling, Kole, Terra, Jericho, Tempest, and Impulse. Several years ago, Starfire escaped her war torn world and landed on Earth, only to be kidnapped by STAR Labs and Niles Caulder in a bid to overthrow the USA government by implanting her alien DNA into humans via Project Titans. The children used in this experiment all developed their powers when Starfire went through puberty. Among the experiments used by STAR labs was a failed clone named after her evil older sister.
 In Nightwing: The New Order, Nightwing ends an ongoing feud between superpowered beings by activating a device that depowers ninety percent of the super powered population, including Starfire. This builds to a future where super powers are outlawed and any super powered being must take inhibitor medications or be contained and studied should the medications not work on them. Prior to this, Dick and Kory were married and have a son named Jake (who soon develops Starfire's powers). After Dick joins the Crusaders and starts policing the metahuman community, Kory leaves her family and joins the Titans to fight against the anti-metahuman government. When Dick and Jake join with the Titans to restore the metahuman population's superpowers, Jake acts cold towards his mother for the effect her absence left on him and his father. After Jake restores the metahuman population's powers, Dick and Kory remained friends and Kory made more of an effort to be there for her son.

Reception
Starfire placed 21st on IGN's 2013 list of the "Top 25 Heroes of DC Comics". She was also ranked 20th in Comics Buyer's Guides "100 Sexiest Women in Comics" list.

In other media

Television

Animation

 Starfire appears in Teen Titans, voiced by Hynden Walch. This version does not use contractions in her speech, has a limited grasp of Earth culture, and tends to misstate or misunderstand common idioms. She also has secret romantic feelings for Robin throughout the whole series until the finale film, Teen Titans: Trouble in Tokyo where they finally admit their feelings for each other and become a couple.
 Starfire appears in the New Teen Titans shorts, voiced again by Hynden Walch. In one short, she kisses a Spanish boy to learn Spanish, just like how she kissed a Japanese boy to learn Japanese in Teen Titans: Trouble in Tokyo. This causes Robin to be jealous and learn French to impress her. When he shows her his amazing French skills, she kisses him on the lips.
 Starfire appears in Teen Titans Go!, voiced again by Hynden Walch. This version, unlike in the 2003 series, does not reciprocate Robin's romantic feelings towards her out of obliviousness, and instead sees him as a brother figure or friend.
 Starfire appears as a non-voiced cameo in a DC Super Friends short.
 Starfire appears as a recurring character in DC Super Hero Girls, voiced again by Hynden Walch. This version is a student and costume designer at Super Hero High School.
 Starfire appears in the DC Super Hero Girls episode "#TweenTitans", voiced by Grey DeLisle. This version is a young child with long, braided pigtails similar to Pippi Longstocking, and tends to lose control of her powers if she eats anything containing sugar.

Live-action

 Starfire appears as a main character in the DC Universe series Titans, portrayed by Anna Diop. In the series, she awakens after a car crash with no memory of her past, and joins forces with Dick Grayson and Gar Logan to protect Rachel Roth from her pursuers. She eventually discovers that her real identity is Koriand'r, an extraterrestrial princess sent to Earth to kill Rachel and prevent the imminent release of her demon father and thus avert the total annihilation of her home world at his hands. Instead, she decides to stay on Earth to help Rachel learn to control her powers as part of Dick's new incarnation of the Titans, while also building a life for herself as "Kory Anders" and dealing with her cruel older sister, who intends to destroy her out of petty jealousy and hatred for their parents loving her more than their eldest child. 
 Starfire appears in the fifth part of the Arrowverse crossover Crisis on Infinite Earths via archive footage from the episode "Titans".

Films
 Starfire appears in the Teen Titans animated series adaptation film Teen Titans: Trouble in Tokyo, with Hynden Walch reprising her previous role from the animated series. In the film, more focus is put on Robin and Starfire's blooming romance, culminating with the two sharing a romantic kiss after the antagonist is defeated and becoming a couple.
 Starfire appears in Superman/Batman: Public Enemies as part of Lex Luthor's force of government-employed superheroes. Although Jennifer Hale receives voice credit, Starfire does not have any lines, the only thing she actually "says" are the vocal effects she makes when Superman punches her.
 Starfire has a very brief cameo in Batman vs. Robin appearing as a still image on Dick Grayson's phone, although the image is obscured due to an incoming call notification from Alfred.
 Starfire makes another cameo in Batman: Bad Blood, voiced by Kari Wahlgren. She and Dick had plans for a date at Titans Tower but it was cancelled by Dick after a fight with Blockbuster and an emergency call from Alfred. Her image on Dick Grayson's phone is once again obscured by an incoming call notification from Alfred, although more of the picture can be seen this time; she can be confirmed to have solid green eyes and red hair.
 Starfire appears in the animated film Justice League vs. Teen Titans, voiced again by Kari Wahlgren. She is revealed to be the oldest and most mature member of the Titans as well as the leader after departure of the original leader Robin, now Nightwing whom she was seen talking to about Damian's issues. Her costume and hairstyle largely correspond to her original comic version. 
 Starfire appears in LEGO DC Comics Super Heroes: Justice League - Gotham City Breakout, with Hynden Walch reprising her role. She is present at Batman's birthday party. She is also seen in a video chat with Robin and at the end of the movie in the Batcave at Batman's welcome back party.
 Starfire appears in DC Super Hero Girls: Hero of the Year, with Hynden Walch reprising her role. She fights Dark Opal's shadow monsters before the ceremony for the Hero of the Year.
 Starfire appears in the animated film Teen Titans: The Judas Contract, with Kari Wahlgren reprising her role. A flashback scene (taking place five years prior) shows that her origin matches her TV series version in which the original Teen Titans rescued her from the Gordanians and she learned the English language by kissing Robin. In the present, she accepts Dick's offer to share an apartment. Though she is unsure of her role as leader, Dick reassures he chose her as the team's leader and his girlfriend for a reason. Like the previous film, she seems incapable of emitting her bright green-colored ultraviolet energy from her eyes.
 Starfire appears as a main focal character in DC Super Hero Girls: Intergalactic Games. As one of the competing heroes for Superhero High, she ends up fighting against her elder sister for the championship. When later Blackfire changes sides, she combines her bright green starbolt energies with Blackfire's lilac ones; where they easily decimated them in one swoop, as she pointed out that were at their strongest using "the blast of togetherness."
 A waitress wearing an exotic version of Starfire's costume (based on her first New 52 appearance) makes a cameo in Batman and Harley Quinn.
 Starfire is one of the main characters in Teen Titans Go! To the Movies, again voiced by Hynden Walch.
 The Teen Titans Go! and original Teen Titans animated series versions of Starfire appear in Teen Titans Go! vs. Teen Titans, with Hynden Walch reprising the role for both. In addition, several alternate versions of Starfire appear throughout the film, which include her counterparts from Tiny Titans, the New Teen Titans comic, and the DC Animated Movie Universe.
Starfire has a minor nonspeaking role in Justice League Dark: Apokolips War. Following the deaths of a majority of the Titans at the hands of Paradooms (a mixture of Parademon and Doomsday DNA), she is turned into a cyborg by Darkseid via Cyborg and works for him as one of his Furies, alongside Martian Manhunter, Wonder Woman, Mera and Hawkman. She fights Raven, and after being freed from Darkseid's control, returns to Earth and is reunited with the resurrected but mentally unstable Nightwing. The dystopian timeline is then reset, due to Flash creating another flashpoint.
Starfire appears in Teen Titans Go! & DC Super Hero Girls: Mayhem in the Multiverse, with Hynden Walch reprising her role.

Video games
 Starfire is a playable character in the Teen Titans Game Boy Advance and console video games, with Hynden Walch reprising her role in the latter.
 Starfire appears in DC Universe Online, voiced by Adrienne Mishler.
 Starfire appears as a summonable character in Scribblenauts Unmasked: A DC Comics Adventure.
 Starfire appears as a playable character via downloadable content pack Heroines vs Villainesses in Lego Batman 3: Beyond Gotham, designed after her appearance in the Teen Titans TV show.
 Starfire appears as a playable fighter via downloadable content in Injustice 2, with Kari Wahlgren reprising her role. Cyborg directly mentions she and Beast Boy were killed in the Metropolis Explosion in Chapter One of the story mode. However, in the Injustice: Gods Among Us tie-in comics, Superman actually trapped Starfire along with the other Titans in the Phantom Zone. In her single player ending, she is the last of the Titans as Dick Grayson and Beast Boy have been killed while Cyborg joined the Regime and Raven became a servant of her father, Trigon. To overcome the loss of her friends, she forms a new Titans team with Blue Beetle, Firestorm, and Supergirl. Her costume color variants include colors to represent Blackfire and her "emoticlones" (a nod to Teen Titans Go!), among others.
 The Teen Titans Go! version of Starfire appears as a playable character in Lego Dimensions, with Hynden Walch reprising her role. She is one of many characters with the ability to fly and references a certain episode when near Aquaman. She also has a major role in the exclusive episode where when the Titans make it to the Lego world, she travels to the world from The Wizard of Oz and is happy by its cheeriness. However, when she makes it to a dance party in Emerald City, she creates disco balls to keep the party going, but accidentally angers the townsfolk, mistaking her for a witch as they keep chucking buckets of water at her.
 Starfire appears as a playable character in Lego DC Super-Villains, with Kari Wahlgren reprising her role.
 Starfire appears as a playable character in DC Unchained.

Toys
 Starfire was released as part of the New Teen Titans wave in 2000 by DC Direct. She was later re-released as part of the New Teen Titans Four Pack.
 Starfire was the 17th issue in the DC Comics Super Hero Collection.
 Starfire was also in the Teen Titans Trading Card Game.

References

External links
Titans Tower: Starfire

DC page: Starfire

Characters created by George Pérez
Characters created by Marv Wolfman
Comics characters introduced in 1980
DC Comics aliens
DC Comics characters who can move at superhuman speeds
DC Comics characters with superhuman strength
DC Comics extraterrestrial superheroes
DC Comics female superheroes
DC Comics martial artists
Fictional characters with absorption or parasitic abilities
Fictional characters with energy-manipulation abilities
Fictional characters with fire or heat abilities
Fictional characters with nuclear or radiation abilities
Fictional characters with post-traumatic stress disorder
Fictional characters with slowed ageing
Fictional characters with superhuman senses
Fictional extraterrestrial princesses
Fictional models
Fictional slaves
Fighting game characters